The Floating Shadows is a triptych made by Nabil Kanso in 1986 on the brutality and suffering inflicted during the Lebanese Civil War. The painting is oil on canvas and measures 2.75 x 7.60 meters (9 X 25 feet). It forms part of the Cluster Paintings series that Kanso began in 1986 and marks the transition to a new approach in his compositional framework. The pictorial layout divides the canvas space  into various sections reflecting a cluster of interlinked planes depicting floating figures of predominantly dark-blue set against deep orange ground and demarcated by white grayish areas.

See also
 America 500 Years
 Lebanon (painting)

References

External links
Works from the Cluster paintings

Triptychs
Modern paintings
War paintings
1986 paintings
Anti-war paintings